The final of the Women's 400 metres Individual Medley event at the European LC Championships 1997 was held in Tuesday 19 August 1997 in Seville, Spain.

Finals

Qualifying heats

Remarks

See also
1996 Women's Olympic Games 400m Individual Medley
1997 Women's World Championships (SC) 400m Individual Medley

References
 scmsom results
 La Gazzetta Archivio
 swimrankings

M